Livonia Transmission is a Ford Motor Company transmission factory in Livonia, Michigan.  It is located at 36200 Plymouth Road.  The plant sits on 182 acres and totals 3.3 million square feet of enclosed floorspace, making it the largest transmission plant in North America.

Products
 Ford 6R Transmission
 Ford 10R Transmission
 Ford 8f Transmission

See also
 List of Ford factories

External links
Map: 

Ford factories
Motor vehicle assembly plants in Michigan
Livonia, Michigan
Buildings and structures in Wayne County, Michigan